Péchés de vieillesse ("Sins of Old Age") is a collection of 150 vocal, chamber and solo piano pieces by composer Gioachino Rossini, who was best known for his operas. The pieces are grouped into fourteen unpublished albums under this self-deprecating and ironic title. The ordering of the pieces in the albums does not reflect the sequence or the dates of their composition, which range from 1857 to shortly before Rossini's death in 1868. The title Péchés de vieillesse was given by Rossini only to volumes V to IX but has been applied to all. The collection is salon music, though of a refined order, meant to be performed in the privacy of Rossini's drawing room at Passy. Volumes I, II, III and XI are vocal music to piano accompaniment. Volumes IV, V, VI, VII, VIII, X and XII are music for solo piano. Volume IX is for chamber ensemble or solo piano. Volumes XIII and XIV comprise vocal and non-vocal music.

Vol I Album italiano
Vol II Album français
Vol III Morceaux réservés
Vol IV Quatre hors d’œuvres et quatre mendiants
Vol V Album pour les enfants adolescents
Vol VI Album pour les enfants dégourdis
Vol VII Album de chaumière
Vol VIII Album de château
Vol IX Album pour piano, violon, violoncello, harmonium et cor
Vol X Miscellanée pour piano
Vol XI Miscellanée de musique vocale
Vol XII Quelques riens pour album
Vol XIII Musique anodine (1857). Presented to his wife Olympe in gratitude for her care during his long intermittent illness.
Vol XIV Altri Péchés de vieillesse

After the composer's death in 1868, his widow, Olympe Pélissier, sold the entire collection, which was then auctioned in London, in 1878. The Société anonyme de publications périodique, Paris, was among the buyers, who sold publishing rights to the firm of Heugel. The edition was prepared by Auguste Vaucorbeil (1821–1884), director of the Paris Opéra, who reordered the pieces and gave them new picturesque titles, as Rossini's often nonsensical titles, which looked forward to Erik Satie's, were deemed unsuitable.

The new editions restore Rossini's expressively precise musical notation and offer heretofore unpublished alternative versions of some Péchés.

Arrangements
In 1918, Ottorino Respighi orchestrated a number of the piano pieces for the ballet La Boutique fantasque. In 1925, he arranged some more piano pieces, from Vol. XII (Quelques riens), as the orchestral suite Rossiniana. Benjamin Britten also used some of Rossini's themes in his orchestrally arranged suites "Soirées musicales", Op. 9, (1936) and "Matinées musicales", Op. 24 (1941).

Recordings
From 2008 to 2018 Naxos Records released 11 albums with Péchés de vieillesse played by pianist Alessandro Marangoni.

References

List and text of the songs on the website of the German Rossini Society
Houghton Library, Harvard University: 35 Péchés in scribal manuscript

External links

Compositions by Gioachino Rossini
Compositions for solo piano